Kanehl (Kanehl the spice merchant, compare Muskat, Zimt, Safran and so on) is a surname. Notable people with the surname include:

Oskar Kanehl (1888–1929), German poet and communist activist
Rod Kanehl (1934–2004), American second baseman and outfielder

See also
Muscat (disambiguation)
Muscat (surname)

Surnames of German origin